Carboxydocella sporoproducens is a species of bacteria belonging to the family of Syntrophomonadaceae.

References

Eubacteriales
Bacteria described in 2006